The budju was the currency of Algeria until 1848. It was subdivided into 24 muzuna, each of 2 kharub or 29 asper. It was replaced by the franc when the country was occupied by France.

Coins
In the early 19th century, copper coins were issued in denominations of 2 and 5 aspers, billon 1 kharub, silver 3, 4, 6, 8 and 12 muzuna, 1 and 2 budju, and gold ¼, ½ and 1 sultani.

References

External links

Currencies of Algeria
Ottoman Algeria
Modern obsolete currencies
1848 disestablishments